Ricky Reed Is Real is the second studio album and debut major-label release by American hip hop and pop music project Wallpaper. The album was released on July 23, 2013 to stores and digital retailers through Boardwalk Records and Epic Records.

Singles
"Good 4 It" was released as the lead single on March 12, 2013.

"Hesher" was released as the second single off of the album in January 2014.

Promotional singles
"Drunken Hearts" was released as the first promotional single off of the album on June 18, 2013 along with the pre-order of the album. The song was used in the trailer for the upcoming comedy film That Awkward Moment (2014).

Track listing
All songs produced by Eric Frederic (Ricky Reed).

Credits and personnel
Credits for Ricky Reed Is Real adapted from AllMusic.

Axident - Engineer, Instrumentation, Producer, Programming
Evan "Kidd" Bogart - A&R, Composer, Executive Producer
Timothy Bogart - Executive Producer
Novena Carmel - Featured Artist, Vocals
Mick Coogan - Composer, Instrumentation, Programming
E-40 - Featured Artist
Aubrey Forman - Project Coordinator
Eric Frederic - Composer
Chris Gehringer - Mastering
Serban Ghenea - Mixing
Tyquan Gholson - Assistant
Dakarai "Dg" Gwitira - Engineer
John Hanes - Mixing Engineer
Trehy Harris - Mixing Assistant
Jaycen Joshua - Mixing
Drew Kapner - Engineer
Sam Locca - Creative Director
Ammar Malick - Composer
Jonathan Mann - Engineer

Meg Margossian - Assistant
Edwin Menjivar - Engineer
Dan Omelio - Composer, Engineer, Instrumentation, Programming
Tom Peyton - Composer, Instrumentation, Programming
David "DQ" Quinones - Engineer, Vocal Producer
Gary Randall - Executive Producer
Ricky Reed - Art Direction, Engineer, Executive Producer, Instrumentation, Producer, Programming
Robopop - Producer
A. Schuller - Composer
T.A. Schuller - Composer
Mark "Spike" Stent - Mixing
Earl Stevens - Composer
Tricky Stewart - A&R, Executive Producer
Brian "B-Luv" Thomas - Engineer
Treehouse Family - Vocals (Background)
Larry Wade - A&R
Wallpaper. - Primary Artist
Rami Yacoub - Vocal Producer

Charts

References

2013 debut albums
Epic Records albums
Albums produced by Ricky Reed